Outa Sight is an album by saxophonist Earl Anderza recorded in 1962 and released on the Pacific Jazz label.

Reception

The Allmusic review by Scott Yanow states: " Anderza's style, while influenced to an extent by Charlie Parker and Jackie McLean, was also touched a little by Eric Dolphy".

Track listing 
All compositions by Earl Anderza, except as indicated.
 "All the Things You Are" (Jerome Kern, Oscar Hammerstein II) - 5:16
 "Blues Baroque" - 4:58
 "You'd Be So Nice to Come Home To" (Cole Porter) - 6:46
 "Freeway" - 2:28
 "Outa Sight" (Jack Wilson) - 5:15
 "What's New?" (Bob Haggart, Johnny Burke) - 7:19
 "Benign" - 3:59
 "Lonesome Road" (Nathaniel Shilkret, Gene Austin) - 4:15 Bonus track on CD reissue
 "I'll Be Around" (Alec Wilder) - 5:15 Bonus track on CD reissue
 "Freeway" {Alternate Take] - 2:43 Bonus track on CD reissue
 "Benign" [Alternate Take] - 4:05 Bonus track on CD reissue

Personnel 
Earl Anderza - alto saxophone
Jack Wilson - piano, harpsichord
Jimmy Bond (tracks 3 & 7), George Morrow (tracks 1, 2 & 4-6) - bass
Donald Dean - drums

References 

1963 albums
Pacific Jazz Records albums